Masaji Iguro (May 14, 1913 – October 4, 2000) was a Japanese ski jumper who competed in the 1930s.

At the 1936 Winter Olympics in Garmisch-Partenkirchen, he finished seventh in the individual large hill competition.

External links
Men's ski jumping results: 1924-36

1913 births
2000 deaths
Japanese male ski jumpers
Olympic ski jumpers of Japan
Ski jumpers at the 1936 Winter Olympics